District 2 may refer to:

Places by country
II District, Turku, in Finland
District 2, Düsseldorf, Germany
District 2, Grand Bassa County, a district in Liberia
District 2, an electoral district of Malta
District 2, a police district of Malta
District 2 (Zürich), a district in the city of Zürich, Switzerland
District 2 (New York City Council), a New York city council district, U.S.
District 2, Ho Chi Minh City, Vietnam

Fiction
District 2 (Hunger Games), a fictional district in the Hunger Games books and films

See also
2nd district (disambiguation)
Sector 2 (Bucharest)